Gnaphalium uliginosum, the marsh cudweed, is an annual plant found on damp, disturbed ground and tracks. It is very widespread across much of Europe, Asia, and North America. It is very common on damp, arable grasslands, paths, and on acid soils.

Description
It is a very woolly annual, growing 4–20 cm tall.

The leaves are wooly on both sides. They are 1 to 5 cm long, narrow oblong shaped.

The flower heads are 3 to 4 mm long. They are arranged in clusters of 3 to 10, surrounded by long leaves. The flower head bracts are wooly, and pale below, with dark chaffy hairless tips. The florets are brownish yellow. The stigmas are pale.

It flowers from July until September.

References

uliginosum
Flora of Europe
Flora of Asia
Flora of North America
Plants described in 1753
Taxa named by Carl Linnaeus